Daemar Montrez Williams known professionally as MARK Universe, is an American songwriter, musician, and producer from Mobile, Alabama. In December 2017 he was a finalist in the IGNITE URBAN National Finals.

Williams founded the record label "Own Heir Music LLC" in 2012.

He has had over 1 million plays on Pandora. and was described as a promising artist on Billboard's Next Big Sound chart.

Discography

Albums
Ima Superstar EP 
Above and Beyond LP (2011)
Tomorrow Starts Today LP (2017)
Gold LP (2020)

Singles
Inspiration (2021)
high beaming and steaming (2020)
1s and 0s Bleep Bloop (2020)
Elbow Drop (This That) (2018)
Trust The Process (2018)
Submarine (2018)
Play For Keeps (2018)
Aint Tripping (2018)
Get Up (2017)

Video
Think I'm Picky (2019)
Port City (2019)
Outta Space (2018)

Awards and recognition
Finalist in the Ignite Urban Music Competition
Promising artist on "Next Big Sound"

References

American hip hop musicians
Musicians from Mobile, Alabama
Songwriters from Alabama
Living people
Year of birth missing (living people)